Neuratelia is a genus of flies belonging to the family Mycetophilidae.

The species of this genus are found in Europe and Northern America.

Species:
 Neuratelia abrevena Garrett, 1925 
 Neuratelia altoandina Henao-Sepúlveda, Wolff & Amorim, 2019

References

Mycetophilidae